The 2015–16 FIA Formula E Championship was the second season of the FIA Formula E championship, held from 24 October 2015 to 3 July 2016. The season saw seven new manufacturers, who were allowed to develop new power trains, specifically the e-motor, the inverter, the gearbox and the cooling system. Nelson Piquet Jr. was the defending Drivers' Champion and Renault  the defending teams' champion. After ten rounds, Sébastien Buemi won the championship by just two points over Lucas di Grassi after setting the fastest lap in the final race, where neither driver finished following an opening lap crash and several attempts to set the fastest lap in their second cars. Renault  retained the teams' championship.

Teams and drivers
The second season was planned to again feature ten teams that were essentially identical from the inaugural season. But, the withdrawal of Trulli after failing to enter the first two races left nine teams competing for the 2015–16 season. Additionally, there were eight manufacturers of power trains that worked together with or were part of the individual teams. Initially only Team Aguri decided to keep the power train from the previous season, while Dragon used the Venturi power train. Due to the regulations, all teams used the same chassis as in the first season. The eight manufacturers were homologated by the FIA in August 2015. After troublesome preseason testing, Andretti decided to revert to the power train from the inaugural season. All teams used the mandated Spark chassis.

‡ Drivers were present at the first two rounds of the championship, but the team failed to pass scrutineering both times.

Team changes
 All ten teams from the first season intended to compete in season two, with some name changes due to sponsorship changes or manufacturer cooperations.
 Eight teams became manufacturers and produce components either by themselves or with a technology partner: Abt (with Schaeffler), Andretti,  (with Renault) Mahindra, NEXTEV, Trulli (with Motomatica), Venturi, and Virgin (with DS Automobiles). On 25 August 2015, Andretti decided to retain the powertrain from the previous season.
 After failing to pass scrutineering of their new drivetrain for the first two races, Trulli withdrew from the championship, leaving 9 teams to compete for the rest of the season.

Driver changes
 Karun Chandhok, Jaime Alguersuari and Jarno Trulli; who raced for Mahindra, Virgin and Trulli respectively in the 2014–15 season; announced that they would not compete in 2015–16.
  Formula One World Champion Jacques Villeneuve joined Venturi, replacing Nick Heidfeld, who moved to Mahindra.
 Jean-Éric Vergne, who joined Andretti mid-way through the 2014–15 season, moved to Virgin for a full-time drive, replacing Alguersuari.
 2012 Formula Renault 3.5 champion Robin Frijns joined the series, driving for Andretti, replacing Vergne.
 Salvador Durán, who competed for Amlin Aguri during the 2014–15 season, joined the Trulli team, replacing Jarno Trulli.
 Oliver Turvey, who raced for Team China in the London round of the 2014–15 season, joined the team full-time.
 GP2 Series veteran Nathanaël Berthon was chosen for the second Team Aguri seat.

Mid-season changes
 Following a hand injury sustained in Putrajaya, Nick Heidfeld was forced to miss the next round in Punta del Este. He was replaced by reigning Formula Renault 3.5 champion Oliver Rowland.
 After three rounds with the Venturi team, Jacques Villeneuve left due to a "disagreement on the direction of the team". His seat was taken by Mike Conway.
 After three rounds Salvador Durán re-joined Team Aguri for the rest of the season after they split with Nathanaël Berthon. The Mexican driver already competed in nine rounds of the first season for Team Aguri. After another three rounds, he was replaced by Chinese driver Ma Qinghua for the Paris ePrix. Ma then competed in the Berlin ePrix and the two races of the London ePrix.
 Due to a DTM commitment, António Félix da Costa missed round 8, but returned for the London ePrix. His replacement was endurance racer René Rast.

Rule changes 
 The rules were opened up for the second season, in keeping with the series' long-term plan to use a single car over the course of a race instead of two separate chassis. Teams were free to pursue their own development of the powertrain, including the e-motor, inverter, gearbox and cooling system.
The total allowed energy consumption from the battery remained limited to 28 kWh.

Calendar
The season was scheduled to include 11 races, held between October 2015 and July 2016. The final calendar was approved by the World Motor Sport Council in October 2015. However, in May 2016, the Moscow ePrix was cancelled "due to recent and unforeseen circumstances related to road closures", reducing the season to 10 races.

Calendar changes
 The Miami ePrix was dropped after the first season. The Monaco ePrix did not feature in this season's calendar, but returned the following season.
 The Mexico City ePrix - the first race on a permanent racing circuit - and the Paris ePrix were new additions to the calendar.
 The Berlin ePrix moved from Tempelhof Airport to the city centre.
 The Moscow ePrix was cancelled in mid-season.

Race results

Notes

Championship standings

Points system
Championship points are awarded as follows:

Unlike the previous season, all results count towards the total.

Drivers' Championship

Notes
† – Drivers did not finish the race, but were classified as they completed more than 90% of the race distance.

Teams' Championship

Notes
† – Drivers did not finish the race, but were classified as they completed more than 90% of the race distance.

References

External links 

 

 
Formula E seasons
Formula E
Formula E
Formula E
Formula E